Ballybunion or Ballybunnion is a coastal town and seaside resort in County Kerry, Ireland, on the Wild Atlantic Way,  from the town of Listowel.

Tourism
Ballybunion has two main beaches, divided by the Castle Green. The Ladies Beach is to the right and the Men's Beach to the left – names arising from the fact that both sexes swam on separate beaches on the orders of the local parish priest, who patrolled daily ensuring the rule wasn't broken. Further to the left of the Men's Beach lies the Long Strand, a 3.2 km stretch of sand, overlooked by the sand dunes of Ballybunion Golf Club.

In the summer, Ballybunion attracts tourists, and the beaches near Ballybunion are a common surfing site, with a dedicated surf school on the Men's Beach. Other traditions include seaweed baths, featuring sea water with serrated wrack. The town itself has a number of restaurants, pubs and cafes, and schools. There is also a statue commemorating the golfing visit of Bill Clinton. This was the first statue of Bill Clinton on public display in the world.

Sport

Golf
Ballybunion Golf Club was founded in 1893 and is home to arguably one of the best links courses in the world. There are 2 courses, the Old Course and the Cashen Course, both situated beside the beach. The club hosted the Murphy's Irish Open in 2000 and Palmer Cup in 2004.

Gaelic football
Stack Park is situated off Sandhill Road, and has an unofficial walk-in entrance off Central Park (mobile home part off Kit Ahern Road).  This floodlight pitch provides training & matches for many divisions of players (incl under 8s, 10s, junior, and senior) as well as ladies football.

The Ballybunion team are called the Beale team, named for a small townland a couple of miles up the coast from Ballybunion. The Beale colours are green with a red stripe.

Health and leisure

Ballybunion Health & Leisure Centre opened in 2007 and is situated on Kit Ahern Road.

See also
 List of towns and villages in Ireland
 Surfing in Ireland

References

Towns and villages in County Kerry
Beaches of County Kerry
Surfing locations in Ireland